Paul Evans (1945 – 1991) was a Welsh poet associated with the British Poetry Revival.  He is included in the anthology British Poetry since 1945 and the 1969 anthology Children of Albion: Poetry of the Underground in Britain.

His work has been described as similar to that of Lee Harwood, with a dreamy tone and surrealist images.  His poems have no definite meaning, but alter each time they are read.

Publications 
 February, 1970
 Prokofiev's Concerto, 1975 
 The Manual for the Perfect Organisation of Tourneys, (Oasis Books, London, 1979) The Sofa Book'', 1987.

Footnotes 

1945 births
Living people
English male poets